Airville is an unincorporated community in Bell County, in the U.S. state of Texas. According to the Handbook of Texas, the community had a population of 10 in 2000. It is located within the Killeen-Temple-Fort Hood metropolitan area.

History
Airville had three businesses in 1931 with only one business and several scattered houses in 1944. Ten people lived in those scattered homes from 1964 through 2000.

Geography

Education
Airville had its own school in 1944. Today, the community is served by the Rosebud-Lott Independent School District.

References

Unincorporated communities in Texas
Unincorporated communities in Bell County, Texas